Two special elections for the Michigan Senate were held in the U.S. state of Michigan on November 2, 2021, in addition to various other local elections and ballot measures.

State elections

Legislative

State Senate 8th district special election

Incumbent Republican Peter Lucido resigned on December 31, 2020 to become prosecutor of Macomb County, Michigan after winning election in 2020. Douglas C. Wozniak, a State Representative, won the Republican primary, while Martin Robert Genter, a United Nations Foundation volunteer and political consultant, won the Democratic primary.

State Senate 28th district special election
Incumbent Republican Peter MacGregor resigned on December 31, 2020 to become treasurer of Kent County, Michigan after winning election in 2020. Mark Huizenga, a State Representative, won the Republican primary, while Keith Courtade, a former county commissioner, won the Democratic primary.

See also
2021 United States state legislative elections

References

 
Michigan